The Direct Subsidy Scheme (DSS) is instituted by the Education Bureau of Hong Kong to enhance the quality of private schools at the primary and secondary levels. The Hong Kong government has been encouraging non-government secondary schools which have attained a sufficiently high educational standard to join the DSS by providing subsidies to enhance the quality of private school education since the 1991–92 school year. In the 2000–01 school year, the DSS was extended to primary schools. In the 2001–02 school year, the terms of the DSS were significantly improved to attract more schools to join the scheme. Under the scheme, schools are free to decide on their curriculum, fees, and entrance requirements.

Standard
Non-government schools must satisfy stipulated standards to be eligible to join the scheme. The standards include requirements regarding the mode of operation (unisessional), class size, teacher's qualifications and facilities etc. For example, schools need a permanent school premises, more than 70 per cent of teachers had to be degree-holders, and they had to have sufficient facilities such as computer, music and language labs.

Curricula
DSS schools are free to design their own curriculum. They are not subject to the guidelines issued by the Education Department. Although DSS schools are required to offer principally a curriculum targeting local students and prepare its students to sit for local examinations, certain DSS schools are currently offering or are set to offer the International Baccalaureate Programme.

Admission
DSS schools are generally free to select their own students, subject to special arrangements with the government in case of shortage of places in government/aided schools. However, DSS schools are not allowed to select their students by conducting written entrance tests.

Financing
DSS schools are free to charge school fees. In the 2009–10 school year, their schools fees range from $3,000 to $110,000 per year.

A DSS school will receive full recurrent subsidy until its fee level reaches 2 1/3 times the average unit cost of an aided school place. Beyond this level, no recurrent subsidy is available. The average unit cost of an aided school place is calculated based on a two-age based system to address the needs of schools with longer development background. In short, a higher level of subsidy would be available to DSS schools that have been operating for 16 years or above. The level of recurrent subsidy received by a DSS school is hence dependent on the number of students enrolled in that particular school.

Also, to help ex-aided DSS schools adapt to new financing methods, ex-aided DSS schools that receive less recurrent subsidy after joining the DSS will continue to receive recurrent subsidy as if they were aided schools for 5 years.

To cater for students from less well-off families, DSS schools are required to set aside at least 10% of their income for fee / scholarship schemes. In addition, for every dollar charged over two-thirds of the average unit cost of an aided school place, the school should set aside 50 cents for scholarship and financial assistance schemes.

Administration
DSS schools are required by the government to issue annual prospectuses, which must contain stipulated classes of information such as vision, mission and objectives of the school, class structure, curriculum, achievements in public exams, extra curricula activities, school fees etc. DSS schools are free to spend their grants for educational purposes, subject to inspection of their audited accounts. Ex-aided DSS schools will be given an option to revert to aided status only if the government changes the formula for calculating DSS subsidy such that the school financial viability is adversely affected.

Controversy
Pegasus Philip Wong Kin Hang Christian Primary School, a DSS school, sparked controversy when the sponsoring body pulled out, and irregularities in its accounts were revealed. The school management committee agreed to pay an advance payment of two to three weeks to Pegasus Social Service Christian Organization, the sponsoring body, which is also the school's service provider and chaired by school supervisor Carmen Leung Suk-ching. The government's monitoring mechanism over Direct Subsidy Scheme schools has therefore been criticised by legislators.

Some DSS schools have also come under criticism for raising school fees despite the economic downturn.

The Scheme has also been criticised as benefiting the private education sector and the well-off students at the expense of the public sector.

Examples
Diocesan Boys' School
Diocesan Girls' School
HKMA David Li Kwok Po College
Good Hope School
Heep Yunn School
St. Paul's Convent School
St. Paul's Co-educational College
St. Paul's College
Li Po Chun United World College, a member of the United World College movement.
Ying Wa College
YMCA of Hong Kong Christian College

See also
 Education in Hong Kong
 Dion Chen

References

External links
Hong Kong Education and Manpower Bureau – Direct Subsidy Scheme 
 List of DSS schools

Education in Hong Kong
 
Subsidies
Charter schools